Voryema Bay is a fjord on the northwestern coast of the Kola Peninsula, on the border between Murmansk Oblast (Russia) and Norway. The Jakobselva (Russian: Voryema) river has its mouth in the bay.

See also
List of fjords of Russia

References 

Fjords of Troms og Finnmark
Fjords of Russia
Bays of the Barents Sea
Bodies of water of Murmansk Oblast